The year 1542 in science and technology included a number of events, some of which are listed here.

Botany
 Leonhart Fuchs publishes his new herbal De historia stirpium commentarii insignes in Basel.

Exploration
 Juan Rodríguez Cabrillo explores the coast of California.

Physiology and medicine
 Jean Fernel publishes De naturali parte medicinae, presenting human physiology as integral to the study of medicine.

Births
 approx. date – Peder Sørensen, Danish physician (died 1602)

Deaths
 August – Peter Henlein, Nuremberg watchmaker (born 1479/80)

References

 
16th century in science
1540s in science